The FFV 016 is a Swedish designed off-route mine designed for use against lightly armoured vehicles. The mine uses a Misznay Schardin effect warhead to produce a self-forging fragment that has an initial velocity of approximately 2,000 metres per second and can penetrate 60 mm of armour at 30 metres range. The mine's body is circular, with a dished front which is aimed using a simple built in sight along the expected route of the target.

The mine is normally fixed to a tree or pole, and is command detonated. The mine is currently in service with the Swedish army, where it is known as the Fordonsmina 14 and is produced by Saab Bofors Dynamics.

Specifications
 Diameter: 150 mm
 Weight: 2.6 kg
 Maximum range: 100 m
 Effective range: 30 m

References
 Jane's Mines and Mine Clearance 2005-2006

Anti-tank mines
Land mines of Sweden